Zapp Mobile was the first CDMA 450 MHz mobile phone operator in Romania, now part of Telekom Romania. In 2006 Zapp got a UMTS 2100 MHz license.

Zapp Mobile was a company of Telemobil S.A. România, which was a spin-off of Telefónica Romania, the first Romanian mobile service provider (now defunct). Telefónica Romania acquired a NMT license on 22 March 1992 and the mobile operator called "Telemobil" went live in April 1993.
On 30 June 2009 Zapp Mobile was acquired by OTE and it is in the process of integration in OTE's Romanian mobile unit Cosmote Romania.

As of 24 March 2013 Zapp CDMA licence expired and the CDMA 450 network was closed down.

Radio Frequency Summary
The following is a list of known frequencies Zapp Mobile employed in Romania:

See also

 List of mobile network operators
 Communications media in Romania

References

External links
 Zapp CDMA Romania

Mobile phone companies of Romania
Companies based in Bucharest